This is the Cabinet of Uttarakhand headed by the Chief Minister of Uttarakhand, Nityanand Swami from 2000–2001.

Council of Ministers
Here is the list of ministers.

 Cabinet Ministers:
 Bhagat Singh Koshyari - Energy, Parliamentary Affairs, Irrigation
 Ramesh Pokhriyal - Finance, Rural Development, Medical Education, Planning, Revenue, Drinking Water, Trade Tax
 Kedar Singh Phonia
 Ajay Bhatt
 Matbar Singh Kandari - Forest
 Mohan Singh Rawat
 Banshidhar Bhagat - Agriculture, Cooperatives, Animal Husbandry, Fisheries, Milk Development, Sugar Mill, Sugarcane Development

 Ministers of State:
 Narayan Ram Das
 Narayan Singh Rana
 Suresh Chand Arya
 Tirath Singh Rawat - Education, Jail and Census
 Nirupama Gaur

References

Uttarakhand ministries
2000 establishments in Uttarakhand
Cabinets established in 2000
Cabinets disestablished in 2001
2001 disestablishments in India